Euroseeds is a non-profit association for the seed industry in the European Union and the European Economic Area. An umbrella organization of national seed associations and individual seed companies, their members represent all aspects of the European seed industry including research, plant breeding, and the production and marketing of seeds of agricultural, horticultural and ornamental plant species. It was founded in November 2000 and was granted the legal status of international non-profit International Association (AISBL) according to Belgian law in April 2002. Its headquarters are located in Brussels, Belgium.

History 
Following increasing inter-organizational cooperation begun in 1998, four separate European seed trade associations were merged into a single organization, at that time ESA, in 2000. They were COSEMCO (seed trade, founded in 1961), ASSOPOMAC (potato breeders, founded in 1964), AMUFOC (forage seed production, founded in 1970) and COMASSO (plant breeders, founded in 1977).

Functions and scope of activities 

According to the Euroseeds' mission statement, it is "the voice of the European seed industry and represents companies and national organisations active in research, breeding, production and marketing of seeds of agricultural, horticultural and ornamental plant species." Euroseeds serves as a lobby group for all seed industry-related issues in the European Union and European Economic Area and specifically on:
 Seed marketing
 Plant breeding 
 Intellectual property rights such as plant breeders's rights and biotech patents
 Plant and seed health such as phytosanitary rules and seed treatments
 Biodiversity and access to genetic resources
 Land use and food production
 Competitiveness of the EU agri-food chain

It also works on collective problems of its membership such as market access in other countries.

Euroseeds represents the European seed industry via the European institutions (European Commission, European Parliament, Council of Ministers) as well as the EU's Community Plant Variety Office (CPVO) and numerous European and international bodies and organisations.

Observer status

Euroseeds has been granted observer status with the following organizations:
 International Seed Federation (ISF)
 International Union for the Protection of New Varieties of Plants (UPOV)
 Organisation for Economic Co-operation and Development (OECD)
 International Seed Testing Association (ISTA)
 International Plant Protection Convention (IPPC)
 Food and Agriculture Organization (FAO)

Events 
Each year in October, Euroseeds holds its Congress which is attended by around 900 participants from industry as well as policy makers, representatives of the European Commission, the EU's Community Plant Variety Office, and international organizations such as UPOV, FAO OECD, the International Seed Testing Association (ISTA).

Membership 
Euroseeds represents over 100 members out of which 34 are national seed associations from EU Members States and the wider Europe. Next to these association members, Euroseeds' membership also comprises 67 individual direct company members, both multi-national as well as specialised small and medium-sized enterprises (SMEs), and 33 associate members from seed related industries, media and academia and from outside of Europe.

Euroseeds presidents

References

Further reading
The following contain material on the activities of the Euroseeds:
Bodiguel, Luc and Cardwell, Michael (2009). The Regulation of Genetically Modified Organisms: Comparative Approaches. Oxford University Press
Jolly, Adam and Philpott, Jeremy (2012). The Handbook of European Intellectual Property Management. Kogan Page Publishers
Maggioni, L. and Lipman, E. (2006). Report of the ECPGR Network Coordinating Groups: First Meeting, 29-31 March 2006, Bonn, Germany. Bioversity International

External links 
 
 Euroseeds 2020 Congress website

Pan-European trade and professional organizations
Agricultural organisations based in Belgium
Seed associations
Organizations established in 2000